The 129th Rescue Squadron (129 RQS) is a unit of the California Air National Guard 129th Rescue Wing located at Moffett Federal Airfield, Mountain View, California. The 129th is equipped with the HH-60G Pave Hawk helicopter. If activated to federal service, the 129 RQS is gained within the United States Air Force by the Air Combat Command (ACC).

Overview
The primary mission is to prepare for wartime taskings as specified by applicable gaining commands. The peacetime mission is under the control of the Governor of California. Upon mobilization, primary specified mission is combat search and rescue (CSAR). When directed by the California State Office of Emergency Services (OES) and/or the Department of Defense (DoD), the mission is to provide disaster relief support as required. This includes search and rescue (SAR) assistance to civil authorities, including International Civil Aeronautics Organization (ICAO) signatories, and foreign governments.

Federal Mission (United States Air Force): To provide manpower, material and equipment resources to conduct and complete combat search and rescue operations on a worldwide basis. To provide manpower, material and equipment to conduct and complete peacetime search operations.

State Mission (California Air National Guard): To furnish trained personnel to respond to state emergencies, such as natural disasters, and to assist civil authorities in the enforcement of the law.

History

Special operations

The California Air National Guard's introduction to the world of special operations began when Air Force leaders decided to phase out active duty air commando units (Known as Air Resupply units) in 1954.  Despite the decision, there was still a need to maintain a limited number of crews and aircraft to support unconventional warfare missions. After lengthy deliberations, the Air Force decided in 1955 to establish four special air warfare units within the Air National Guard: the 129th in California, the 130th in West Virginia, the 143d in Rhode Island, and the 135th Air Resupply Group in Maryland.

The 129th Air Resupply Squadron was established in April 1955 as a new California Air National Guard unit with no previous United States Air Force history or lineage by the National Guard Bureau. Activated on 4 April at Hayward Municipal Airport, the squadron was assigned to the 129th Air Resupply Group.  Allocated to Military Air Transport Service (MATS), and equipped with C-46 Commando transports.

The 129th was designated at the time as a "Psychological Warfare" unit which supported USAF unconventional warfare (guerrilla warfare), direct action (commando-type raids), strategic reconnaissance (intelligence gathering), and PSYWAR operations.  The C-46 was supplemented by SA-16 Albatross amphibious aircraft beginning in 1956. The SA-16 (later redesignated HU-16) completely replaced the C-46s in 1963.  Training for water landings with the SA-16 was extremely hazardous. To make matters worse, doctrine required pilots to land their aircraft on water at night, with no landing lights.

Ultimately, the 129th's mission included counterinsurgency, military civic action, psychological operations, tactical air operations, and unconventional warfare. In addition to blacked-out water landings, the SA-16 crews practiced pulling personnel from the ground by means of the Fulton Recovery System, which was "like bungee jumping in reverse."

Reassigned to Tactical Air Command in 1963 and re-designated as Air Commando unit, following the revival of an active duty air commando unit at Hurlburt Field, Florida in line with President John F. Kennedy's initiative to bolster the United States military special forces during the early involvement in the Vietnam War.  In 1963, the 129th participated in Exercise Swift Strike III, one of the largest military maneuvers since World War II. During the exercise, the unit not only flew a variety of special air warfare missions.

Continuing its mission and training with the Active duty 1st Air Commando Group in Northern Florida, in 1968 HQ USAF directed all Air Commando organizations be re-designated as "Special Operations" units to be more descriptive of their mission.

Rescue and recovery

In May 1975 after the end of the Vietnam War, the mission of the 129th was realigned, and the unit became part of the Aerospace Rescue and Recovery Service, Military Airlift Command.    In 1980 the unit moved from Hayward to Naval Air Station Moffett Field.

The 129th has been assigned to support operation Iraqi Freedom.

In 2003 by the Air Force Special Operations Command re-organized Air National Guard rescue units and created separate squadrons for fixed-wing, helicopter and pararescue elements of the 129th Rescue Squadron. The HH-60 helicopter flight became 129th Rescue Squadron; the HC-130P Hercules flight become the 130th Rescue Squadron, and the pararescue flight became the 131st Rescue Squadron.

The 129th RQS has been assigned to support Operation Iraqi Freedom (Iraq) and Operation Enduring Freedom (Afghanistan) in support of the Global War on Terrorism.

Lineage
 Designated 129th Air Resupply Squadron, and allotted to California ANG, 1955
 Received federal recognition and activated, 3 April 1955
 Re-designated: 129th Troop Carrier Squadron, 1 November 1958
 Re-designated: 129th Troop Carrier Squadron (Medium), 28 January 1962
 Re-designated: 129th Air Commando Squadron, 1 July 1963
 Re-designated: 129th Special Operations Squadron, 8 August 1968
 Re-designated: 129th Aerospace Rescue and Recovery Squadron, 3 May 1975
 Re-designated: 129th Air Rescue Squadron, 1 October 1989
 Re-designated: 129th Rescue Squadron''', 16 March 1992

Assignments
 129th Air Resupply Group, 3 April 1955
 129th Troop Carrier Group, 1 November 1958
 129th Air Commando Group, 1 July 1963
 129th Special Operations Group, 8 August 1968
 129th Aerospace Rescue and Recovery Group, 3 May 1975
 129th Air Rescue Group, 1 October 1989
 129th Rescue Group, 16 March 1992
 129th Operations Group, 1 October 1995 – Present

Stations
 Hayward Municipal Airport, California, 3 April 1955
 Naval Air Station Moffett Field, California, 1980
 Moffett Federal Airfield, 1 July 1994 – Present

Aircraft

 C-46 Commando, 1955–1963
 SA-16 Albatross, 1963–1968
 C-119 Flying Boxcar, 1968–1975
 Cessna U-3A, 1968–1975
 U-6A Beaver, 1968–1975

 U-10D Super Courier, 1968–1975
 HH-3E Jolly Green Giant, 1975–1991
 HC-130P Hercules, 1975–2002
 MC-130P Combat Shadow, 2002–2003
 HH-60G Pave Hawk, 1991–Present

References

External links

Squadrons of the United States Air National Guard
Military units and formations in California
129